Predrag Savović (born 21 May 1976) is a Montenegrin former professional basketball player. Among many teams in his professional career he played for KK Partizan Belgrade, the NBA's Denver Nuggets and Iurbentia Bilbao of the Spanish ACB.

Early life and college career

Savović was born in Pula, SR Croatia, at the time part of SFR Yugoslavia, to a family of Montenegrin descent. He attended Ivan Goran Kovačić High School in Herceg Novi, Montenegro. He attended the University of Alabama-Birmingham (UAB) from 1997 to 1998 and then the University of Hawaii at Manoa, in the U.S., from 1998 to 2002. He holds degrees in International Business and Finance as well as Economics from the University of Hawaii at Manoa. He also holds an EMBA Degree from University of Deusto, Deusto Business School. Predrag was a first-team All-Western Athletic Conference pick in his junior and senior seasons, the MVP of the 2002 WAC tournament, and an honorable mention All-American selection by the Associated Press. Hawaii advanced to the first round of the NCAA tournament of 2002.

Career

Savović grew up playing for Partizan Belgrade, Beovuk, and IVA Zorka Pharm Šabac. He moved to the American NCAA even though he was well into his twenties. Undrafted, he signed with the National Basketball Association's Denver Nuggets in 2002, for whom he played during the 2002-03 NBA season, making him one of only few European players at guard position by that time that made a transition from NCAA to NBA without being drafted. Last five years of his professional basketball career he has been an important member of Bilbao Basket, a member of ACB League in Spain until his retirement in 2009.

Personal life and business career

Predrag Savović is a co-founder of IBEXMONT D.O.O:, a consulting firm based in Republic of Montenegro. . He is also a Public Speaker on subject of Team Work and Team Efficiency working closely with many companies in Spain and other European countries. He is also a co-founder of BADAIS INTERNATIONAL a successful flower wholesale business in London UK.

His younger brother, Boban, is also a retired basketball player and an assistant coach of JL Bourg Basket of PRO A French premiere basketball league.  

After some years working in Bilbao Basket he became the president of the club in December 2010 until he left the club in the summer of 2017. He held a position as a CEO of Basket Zaragoza 2002 S.A.D. professional basketball club in Spain from 2017 - 2019. From 2019 to 2021 he was employed one more time as a CEO of CD Basket Bilbao Berri S.A.D. 

In November 2021 he has join a team of Fintech company BRYDG CAPITAL in London as a Business Development Manager.

See also 
 List of Serbian NBA players

References

External links
NBA.com biography
EurocupBasketball.com Profile
Hawaii Warriors bio

1976 births
Living people
Bilbao Basket players
Denver Nuggets players
Hawaii Rainbow Warriors basketball players
KK Beovuk 72 players
KK Partizan players
KK Iva Zorka Šabac players
Liga ACB players
National Basketball Association players from Serbia
Naturalised citizens of Spain
People from Herceg Novi
Sportspeople from Pula
Serbian basketball executives and administrators
Serbian men's basketball players
Serbian expatriate basketball people in Belgium
Serbian expatriate basketball people in the United States
Serbian expatriate basketball people in Spain
Serbs of Croatia
Croatian expatriate basketball people in Serbia
Shooting guards
Spanish men's basketball players
Spanish people of Serbian descent
Spanish people of Montenegrin descent
Serbian emigrants to Spain
Spirou Charleroi players
UAB Blazers men's basketball players
Undrafted National Basketball Association players